The Battle of Yunlin-Chiayi was fought in the Yunlin-Chiayi region during the Japanese invasion of Taiwan. It was one of the very few major counter-offensive the Formosan initiated on the Japanese, and possibly the only successful one. Although the Formosan succeeded in recapturing Yunlin, they were eventually driven out in a subsequent series of Japanese assaults on the city.

See also
 History of Taiwan
 Republic of Formosa

Notes

References
 Davidson, James W. (1903). The Island of Formosa, Past and Present : history, people, resources, and commercial prospects : tea, camphor, sugar, gold, coal, sulphur, economical plants, and other productions. London and New York: Macmillan. OCLC 1887893. OL 6931635M.

 
 
 

Japanese invasion of Taiwan (1895)
1895 in Taiwan
Taiwan under Japanese rule
Yunlin-Chiayi
Yunlin-Chiayi
1895 in Japan
September 1895 events